Goat Island is an island in the Willamette River in Clackamas County, Oregon. It is located within the city limits of West Linn, Oregon. Goat Island is a habitat for herons and contains 30 heron nests.

References

Islands of the Willamette River
Landforms of Clackamas County, Oregon
Uninhabited islands of Oregon
West Linn, Oregon